Richard Pew (born April 22, 1933) is a recognized American engineering psychologist in the field of human factors.

Pew earned a Bachelor of Electrical Engineering from Cornell University in 1956 where he was a member of Sigma Pi fraternity. He earned an AM in psychology from Harvard University in 1960. He completed a PhD in psychology in 1963 under the guidance of Paul Fitts at the University of Michigan, and subsequently became a faculty member there. Pew has spent many years as a research scientist at BBN Technologies, and is a Fellow of the Human Factors and Ergonomics Society.

Pew is also an accomplished fencer, and competed in the individual and team épée events at the 1956 Summer Olympics.

References

External links
 

1933 births
Living people
21st-century American psychologists
Human–computer interaction
American male épée fencers
Olympic fencers of the United States
Fencers at the 1956 Summer Olympics
Sportspeople from New York City
Cornell University College of Engineering alumni
Harvard University alumni
University of Michigan alumni
University of Michigan faculty
20th-century American psychologists